İğdeli can refer to:

 İğdeli, Burdur
 İğdeli, Çorum
 İğdeli, Horasan
 İğdeli, Kovancılar
 İğdeli, Oltu
 İğdeli, Şenkaya
 İğdeli, Sinanpaşa